Cesare Antoniolli was an Italian composer, arranger and orchestral director of popular music active during the 1900-1960 period. He composed music alongside notable lyricists, arranged music for major publishers, and directed his own orchestra backing popular singing stars on their recordings. The orchestra was variously nominated as Orchestra Antoniolli, Orchestra da Ballo Antoniolli, Orchestra Melodica Napoletana Antoniolli and Orchestra Tropical Antoniolli. He played an important creative part in the survival (during the Depression and war years) and subsequent post-war rebirth, of Italy's popular music scene.

Creative works 
Cesare Antoniolli composed music for popular songs of the era alongside noted lyricists  Danpa (Dante Panzuti) and Renzo Dolci. In October 1945, just a few months following the end of the war, a public concert was held for the people of Milan in the large Teatro del Popolo inside the city's pride and joy, the Castello Sforzesco (AD1360) that had been severely damaged by an allied bombing campaign in 1943. The concert organized by the new government agency Ente Nazionale Assistenza Lavoratori (ENAL) (meaning National Entity of Assistance for Workers) included the announcement and performance by the winners of a popular songwriting competition, the first of its kind in post-war Italy to capture the hearts of the nation (until the outset of the Sanremo Festival in January 1951 and the Festival di Napoli in 1952). Cesare Antoniolli and Renzo Dolci won first prize in the second category (rhythmic songs) of the national song competition with their song "Dice Quella Lettera" ('the letter says'). One of Antoniolli and Danpa's songs "Il Paradiso Dei Baci" ('the paradise of kisses') was performed at the second Festival di Zurigo (Il Festivale Della Canzone Italiana in Svizzera) in September 1958. It was sung by singing star Fiorella Bini, accompanied by the orchestra of Eros Sciorilli and recorded on Cetra Records.

Compositions 
 In Val Gardena (C'e Un Trenin) Antoniolli/Danpa, Swing-Moderato, Panagini 
 La Maestrina Dalla Penne Rossa Antoniolli/Danpa, Slow, Panagini 1955 
 IL Pendolino Antoniolli/Danpa, Moderato, Panagini 1957 
 Una Voce Nella Sera Antoniolli/Danpa, Slow, Chillin 1951 
 A Fior Di Labbra Antoniolli/Danpa, Valzer-Lento, VIS-Radio 1956 
 Fotocine Antoniolli/Dolci, Foxtrot-Allegro, Menestrello 1940 
 Dice Quella Lettera Antoniolli/Dolci 1945 
 Amarsi In Silenzio Antoniolli/Dolci, Euterpe 1946 
 Il Paradiso Dei Baci Antoniolli/Danpa, Valzer Lento, 1951 
 Forza Piola! Antoniolli/Danpa, Mazurka Ranchera, Panagini 1952 
 Fa Molto Capri Antoniolli/Antoniolli, Swing-Moderato, Chillin 1952

Film Score 
In 1955 Cesare Antoniolli collaborated with renowned animation artist Gino Gavioli (9 May 1923 - 19 November 2016) who had formed with his brother Roberto the Gamma Film company in (1953-1999)  that produced animated films in Milan, most famously the Carosello series.
Cesare was asked to compose the soundtrack for a short animation film called "La Pentola Miracolosa" ('the miraculous pot') that presented a fable regarding the virtues of long hard work and worthy causes, as opposed to becoming rich overnight. Its synopsis describes: the story of a carver who, saving as much as possible from the proceeds of the sale of his wooden toys, dreams of one day being able to buy a huge organ.
The 35mm color film of 13m:13s (364 metres in length) carries a beautifully orchestrated soundtrack (including a choir arrangement) evidence of Cesares musical abilities and experience gained not-least from the previous 10 years of popular music development post-war.
The film was registered for copyright on 7 December 1955 and an official document issued in Rome on 30 April 1960 now archived by the Italia Taglia Project. In 1956 it was presented at the 17th La Biennale Festival of Venice (International Cinematographic Arts Exhibition) in the Children's Section.

Publishing 
Cesare Antoniolli created both music and arrangements for popular songs with prominent publishers Edizioni Panagini (Novara), Edizioni Leonardi (Milan), Edizioni Musicali Chillin (Turin), Edizioni Musicali Menestrello (Milan), Redi Edizioni Musicali (Milano), VIS-Radio (Naples) and Edizioni Musicali Euterpe (Genoa). Apart from the small selection of arrangements of cover songs listed below, he created arrangements of his own compositions and a working library for his orchestra, from simple piano/vocal sheets to full popular orchestra scores.

On several occasions he worked alongside composer Gino Redi (of Redi Edizioni Musicali and Redi/Ponti/De Laurentis publishing) most notably scoring the arrangement for the Redi/Galdieri song "T'ho Voluto Bene" sung by Flo Sandon's in the 1951 film 'Anna'. The song was later translated into English and made a world-wide hit as "Non Dimenticar" by Nat King Cole in 1958.

Arrangements 
 Pusilleco 'Nsentimento G. Cioffi/DeLutio, Fox-Moderato, Leonardi 1949 
 Famme Durmi' Panzuti/Danpa, Swing, Leonardi 1951 
 Ricordi?...(il Primo Ballo) Alvaro/Alvaro, Slow, Style-Leonardi 1951 
 Un'Altra Sigaretta Alvaro/Colombi, Beguine-Lento, Style-Leonardi 1951 
 Non Sparate...(Nel Pianista) Alvaro/Testoni, Canzone-Swing, Style-Leonardi
 E Passa Un Altro Giorno! D'Arena/Marena/Volpi, Slow, Style-Leonardi 
 Cancello Chiuso Redi/Bertini, Canzone-Beguine, Redi 1951 
 T'ho Voluto Bene (Non Dimenticar) Redi/Galdieri, Canzone Slow, RPD 1951

Recordings 
Cesare Antoniolli's orchestral work includes accompaniment and direction of recordings with singers Teddy Reno, Lello Perrelli, Tati Casoni, Gigi Marra and Serafino Bimbo. These were produced by record companies Durium Records, Compagnia Generale del Disco (CGD) and Cetra Records. Research conducted on the internet has uncovered images of a total thirty-five record labels printed with Antoniolli's name between 1930 and 1952 in this capacity.
The instrumentation of popular music orchestras of the period included piano, double-bass, drum kit, a small brass and woodwind section, accordion, a small string section, percussion and acoustic guitar. And for larger live concert performances and recording sessions a female and/or male vocal duo or trio were added. In 1948, barely in singer Teddy Reno's first year in Milano (and having just founded the CGD record company at the tender age of 22), Cesare Antoniolli's dance orchestra accompanied him on a recording of the Frank Sinatra hit song "Day By Day" (Cahn/Stordahl/Weston). The song was translated into Italian as "Oggi O Mai" ('today or never') by renowned lyricist Ardo (Matteo Treppiedi), who also translated singer Serafino Bimbo's Italian version of "La Raspa" (Grant/Nisa) backed by Orchestra Antoniolli in 1949.

Cesare recorded eight songs in Latin-American/Cuban styles with singer Tati Casoni, the only time his name on record labels included his initial. Recorded on the Cetra label some of the songs were translated by prominent lyricists Giacomo Mario Gili (pseudo. Larici) (1906-1996), Enzo Luigi Poletto (1906-1983), Testoni and Panzeri. His ensemble was called Orchestra Tropical C. Antoniolli and the songs recorded in Torino in October 1950 and January 1951, immediately following the period when Tati Casoni had toured several times to South America. Neopolitan singing star Lello Perrelli recorded at least eighteen songs in his local dialect with the Orchestra Melodica Napoletana Antoniolli. They were all produced on the CGD Blue label and are by far the largest group of Cesare Antoniolli's work rediscovered in the course of this research.

Orchestra Melodica Napoletana directed by Maestro Antoniolli, sung by Lello Perrelli 
 Tradimento D'Esposito/Resti, CGD Blue 1930 
 Peccato Cunfessato Barzizza/Manilo, CGD Blue 
 'A Riggina D' 'E Tarantelle Giannini/Raul, CGD Blue 1948 
 'E Campane Napulitane D'Esposito/Nisa, CGD Blue 
 Maria E' Robba Mia Capodanno/Trusiano, CGD Blue 
 Cara Lucia Mazzocco/Murolo, CGD Blue 
 Sciummo Concina/Bonagura, CGD Blue 
 'O Principe Indiano Vincenzo Emilio/Barille, CGD Blue 
 Tuppe Ttu' Giuliani/Rotondella, CGD Blue 
 Sarta 'E Biancheria Napolitano/Rendine, CGD Blue 
 Margellina Bonagura/Bonagura, CGD Blue 
 Nustalgia Bonagura/Bonagura, CGD Blue 
 Core 'Ngrato (Catari, Catari) Cardillo/Cordiferro, CGD Blue 
 Passione Bovio/Valente/Tagliaferri, CGD Blue 
 So' Nnammurato 'E Te Falcomata/Manilo, CGD 1952 
 Mandulino Napulitano Rossi/Nisa, CGD 1952 
 Surriento D' 'E Nnamurate Bonagura/Benedetto, CGD 1952 
 Nu Quarto 'E Luna Oliviero/Manlio, CGD 1952

Orchestra Antoniolli, sung by Teddy Reno 
 Vorrei Piangere Mascheroni/Mascheroni, Slow, CGD Red 
 Amarti Con Gli Occhi Rossi/Colombi, Valzer-Lento, CGD Red 
 Ti Ho Scritto Tante Volte Ceragioli/Testoni, SlowMod., CGD Red 1948 
 Donde Vas Brigada/Pinchi, Foxtrot, CGD Red

Orchestra Antoniolli, sung by Serafino Bimbo 
 La Raspa Grant/Nisa/Ardo, Raspa, CGD Red 1949

Dance Orchestra directed by Maestro Antoniolli, sung by Teddy Reno 
 Vola, Colomba!... Cherubini/Concina, Moderato, CGD Blue 1952
 Ninna, Nanna (Ai Sogni Perduti) Testoni/Panzeri/Bassi, Canzone-Beguine, CGD Blue 1952
 Aggio Perduto O Suonno Redi/Natili, Canzone-Slow, CGD Red 1952
 Oggi O Mai (Day By Day, Sinatra 1946) Cahn/Stordahl/Weston/Ardo, Slow-Moderato, CGD Red 1948
 Addio Vetturino C.A.Rossi/Capece, Canzone-Slow, CGD Blue

Orchestra directed by Maestro Antoniolli, sung by Tati Casoni 
 Buona Notte, Angelo Mio MacGillar/Danpa/Pallesi, Slow, Leonardi/Durium 1946 
 Brasilena Redi/Nisa, Fox-Rumba, Durium 1946 
 Cantando Con Le Lacrime Agli Occhi Panzeri/Mascheroni, Slow-Fox, Melodi/Durium 1946 
 Male D'Amore D'Anzi/D'Amico, Durium 1947 
 Non Ho Piu...La Veste A Fiori Blu D'Anzi/D'Amico, Durium 1947 
 Basta Un Po' Di Swing Panzuti/Danpa, Durium 1947

Orchestra Tropical directed by Maestro C.Antoniolli, sung by Tati Casoni 
 "Un Poquito" Del Tuo Amor Gutierrez/Larici, Bolero-Mambo, Cetra 14 Oct.1950
 La Mucura (La Secchia) Fuentes/Poletto, Canzone Guaracha, Cetra 14 Oct.1950
 Dolcissimo Mambo Morato/Testoni-Panzeri, Bolero-Mambo, Cetra 14 Oct.1950
 Madrid Lara/Larici-Testoni, Bolero, Cetra 14 Oct.1950
 Un Miracolo Lecuona/Poletto, Bolero-Beguine, Cetra 17 Jan.1951
 Contigo Estrada-Baez, Bolero, Cetra 17 Jan.1951
 Adios Mariquita Linda Jimenes/Jimenes, Bolero, Cetra 17 Jan.1951
 Ti Amo (Cuatros Vidas) Carreras/Jarver/Poletto, Bolero, Cetra 17 Jan.1951

Orchestra directed by Maestro Antoniolli, sung by Gigi Marra 
 Forza Piola! Antoniolli/Danpa, Mazurka Ranchera, Panagini 1952

Orchestra directed by Eros Sciorilli, sung by Fiorella Bini 
 iL Paradiso Dei Baci Antoniolli/Danpa, Valzer-Lento, Cetra 1951 (performed at Festival di Zurigo, Sept.1958)

Media coverage 
In the renowned Italian publication 'Musica, Rassegna Della Vita Musicale Italiana' (Review of Italian Musical Life) later called Musica e dischi, Cesare Antoniolli's work as composer and orchestral director was mentioned six times in articles and advertisements between 1945 and 1952. These mentions alone cover twenty-six songs produced in the period, beginning with an article describing the Castello Sforzesco concert on the front page of its first edition published in  October 1945.

Capri Island  
A 1952 song for which Cesare Antoniolli had written both words and music "Fa Molto Capri" ('its very Capri') was rediscovered in 2010, re-recorded and inducted into a historical archive of poetry and songs on the Italian island of Capri. Its lyrics suggest how visitors should dress and behave while in Capri in order to be fashionable and trendy. The archive was produced in the form of a hard-cover book "Capri Dei Sognatori" ('the Capri of dreamers') by Neopolitan writer/musicians Vincenzo Faiella and Sergio Vellino

References 

Italian male composers
20th-century Italian composers